Cherry Hazel Sweet Faye Vidal Bautista (born as Cherry Hazel Vidal Agustin), popularly known as Sheree, is a Filipina actress, singer, dancer, model, and painter. 

Born in Cagayan de Oro and raised in Bukidnon, she is a member of Viva Hot Babes. She is a cousin of Jinky Vidal, formerly of Freestyle, and a distant relative of Mark Bautista.

Sheree has a daughter with theater actor and singer Gian Magdangal whom she is separated with.

Filmography

Television

References

External links

Filipino television actresses
Living people
Year of birth missing (living people)
GMA Network personalities
ABS-CBN personalities
TV5 (Philippine TV network) personalities
Viva Artists Agency